Corallus cookii, also known as Cook's tree boa or Cooke's tree boa, is a species of nonvenomous snake in the family Boidae. The species is endemic to the island of St. Vincent in the Caribbean. There are no recognized subspecies.

Etymology
The specific name, cookii, is in honor of English artist and naturalist Edward William Cooke.

Description
C. cookii is similar to C. hortulana and C. grenadensis, only smaller, with adults reaching a total length (including tail) of 5 feet (152 cm), and being mainly gray or brown in color. Not more than a few specimens exist in captivity.

Reproduction
C. cookii is viviparous.

Geographic range
Endemic to the island of St. Vincent in the Caribbean, C. cookii is known only from a few locations on the island. The type locality given is "West Indies", which was restricted to "St. Vincent" by Henderson (1997).

Habitat
The preferred natural habitat of C. cooki is forest, but it is also abundant in urban areas.

References

Further reading

Gray JE (1842). "Synopsis of the species of prehensile-tailed Snakes, or family Boidæ". Zoological Miscellany, London 2: 41–46. (Corallus cookii, new species, p. 42).
Henderson RW (1997). "A Taxonomic Review of the Corallus hortulanus Complex of Neotropical Tree Boas". Caribbean Journal of Science 33 (3-4): 198–221.
Schwartz A, Thomas R (1975). A Check-list of West Indian Amphibians and Reptiles. Carnegie Museum of Natural History Special Publication No. 1. Pittsburgh, Pennsylvania: Carnegie Museum of Natural History. 216 pp. (Corallus enydris cooki, p. 181).

cookii
Snakes of the Caribbean
Fauna of Saint Vincent and the Grenadines
Reptiles described in 1842
Taxa named by John Edward Gray
Endemic fauna of Saint Vincent and the Grenadines